Arma District is one of thirteen districts of the Castrovirreyna Province in Peru.

References